The Hongsa Coal Mine is a coal mine in Sainyabuli Province. The mine has coal reserves amounting to 424 million tonnes of lignite, one of the largest coal reserves in the world.

References 

Coal mines in Laos